Five ships of the Royal Navy have borne the name HMS Hecate, after Hecate, a goddess in early Greek mythology:

 was a 12-gun gunvessel launched in 1797 and sunk as a breakwater in 1809.
 was an 18-gun  launched in 1809 and sold in 1817.
 was a 4-gun wooden  paddle sloop launched in 1839, fitted out for survey work in 1860 and sold in 1865.
 was an iron screw  breastwork monitor launched in 1871 and sold in 1903.
 was a  launched in 1965. She was put up for disposal in 1991, and sailed to India to be broken up in 1994.

Royal Navy ship names